Cryptomastridae is a family of armoured harvestmen in the order Opiliones. There are two genera and four described species in Cryptomastridae, found in Oregon and Idaho.

The members of Cryptomastridae were formerly members of the family Cladonychiidae.

Genera
These two genera belong to the family Cryptomastridae:
 Cryptomaster Briggs, 1969
 Speleomaster Briggs, 1974

References

Further reading

 
 
 
 
 

Harvestmen
Harvestman families